The Edward F. Albee Foundation was started by its namesake, playwright Edward Albee, in 1967, after revenue from his play Who's Afraid of Virginia Woolf? proved abundant.

The foundation, which operates from Montauk on Long Island in a large, white converted barn, was created with the intent of aiding young visual artists and writers.

Some notable writers and artists who have attended in past years include:

Christopher Durang, 
Spalding Gray, 
Cindy Hinant ,
A.M. Homes, Tom Holmes, 
Will Eno,
Keith Milow,
Sean Scully, and
Mia Westerlund-Roosen

External links
Official website

Arts foundations based in the United States